Prežulje (also Preža, Preže, or Prežulja;  or Presuln) is a remote abandoned former settlement in the Municipality of Kočevje in southern Slovenia. The area is part of the traditional region of Lower Carniola and is now included in the Southeast Slovenia Statistical Region. Its territory is now part of the village of Gornja Briga.

History
Prežulje was a village inhabited by Gottschee Germans. It was founded in the 16th century and had a farm divided into two half-farms according to the land registry of 1574. Before the Second World War one Slovene family also lived in the village. The village was burned during the war.

References

External links
Prežulje on Geopedia
Pre–World War II map of Prežulje with oeconyms and family names

Former populated places in the Municipality of Kočevje